The 2017–18 Dallas Mavericks season was the 38th season of the franchise in the National Basketball Association (NBA). The Mavericks struggled during the season and finished the season with a 24–58 record, missing the playoffs for the second consecutive season, and suffered their worst record since the 1997-98 season.

Draft

Roster

<noinclude>

Standings

Division

Conference

Game log

Preseason

|-bgcolor=ccffcc
| 1
| October 2
| Milwaukee
| 
| Yogi Ferrell (12)
| three players (5)
| Wesley Matthews (5)
| American Airlines Center16,223
| 1–0
|-bgcolor=ccffcc
| 2
| October 4
| Chicago
| 
| Harrison Barnes (17)
| Dirk Nowitzki (9)
| Maalik Wayns (5)
| American Airlines Center17,091
| 2–0
|-bgcolor=ffcccc
| 3
| October 5
| @ Orlando
| 
| Dennis Smith Jr. (13)
| Jeff Withey (8)
| Yogi Ferrell (3)
| Amway Center15,849
| 2–1
|-bgcolor=ccffcc
| 4
| October 9
| Orlando
| 
| Dennis Smith Jr. (16)
| Salah Mejri (9)
| Dennis Smith Jr. (7)
| American Airlines Center16,055
| 3–1
|-bgcolor=ccffcc
| 5
| October 12
| @ Atlanta
| 
| Gian Clavell (19)
| Jeff Withey (8)
| Maalik Wayns (6)
| McCamish Pavilion6,759
| 4–1
|-bgcolor=ffcccc
| 6
| October 13
| @ Charlotte
| 
| Harrison Barnes (24)
| Dirk Nowitzki (9)
| Dennis Smith Jr. (9)
| Spectrum Center10,018
| 4–2

Regular season

|-bgcolor=ffcccc
| 1
| October 18
| Atlanta
| 
| Noel, Smith Jr. (16)
| Nerlens Noel (11)
| Dennis Smith Jr. (10)
| American Airlines Center19,709
| 0–1
|-bgcolor=ffcccc
| 2
| October 20
| Sacramento
| 
| Harrison Barnes (24)
| Dirk Nowitzki (9)
| J. J. Barea (10)
| American Airlines Center19,273
| 0–2
|-bgcolor=ffcccc
| 3
| October 21
| @ Houston
| 
| Barea, Ferrell (19)
| six players (5)
| Yogi Ferrell (6)
| Toyota Center18,055
| 0–3
|-bgcolor=ffcccc
| 4
| October 23
| Golden State
| 
| Wesley Matthews (19)
| three players (7)
| J. J. Barea (8)
| American Airlines Center19,875
| 0–4
|-bgcolor=ccffcc
| 5
| October 25
| Memphis
| 
| Dennis Smith Jr. (19)
| Harrison Barnes (6)
| Dennis Smith Jr. (5)
| American Airlines Center19,674
| 1–4
|-bgcolor=ffcccc
| 6
| October 26
| @ Memphis
| 
| Harrison Barnes (22)
| Harrison Barnes (11)
| Dennis Smith Jr. (9)
| FedExForum15,839
| 1–5
|-bgcolor=ffcccc
| 7
| October 28
| Philadelphia
| 
| Harrison Barnes (25)
| three players (6)
| Dennis Smith Jr. (8)
| American Airlines Center19,567
| 1–6
|-bgcolor=ffcccc
| 8
| October 30
| @ Utah
| 
| Dirk Nowitzki (18)
| Dwight Powell (10)
| Devin Harris (6)
| Vivint Smart Home Arena16,221
| 1–7

|-bgcolor=ffcccc
| 9
| November 1
| @ LA Clippers
| 
| Dennis Smith Jr. (18)
| Dirk Nowitzki (8)
| Wesley Matthews (4)
| Staples Center13,487
| 1–8
|-bgcolor=ffcccc
| 10
| November 3
| New Orleans
| 
| Harrison Barnes (26)
| Salah Mejri (13)
| J. J. Barea (5)
| American Airlines Center19,894
| 1–9
|-bgcolor=ffcccc
| 11
| November 4
| @ Minnesota
| 
| Dennis Smith Jr. (18)
| Dennis Smith Jr. (5)
| J. J. Barea (6)
| Target Center16,837
| 1–10
|-bgcolor=ccffcc
| 12
| November 7
| @ Washington
| 
| Harrison Barnes (31)
| Salah Mejri (12)
| Dennis Smith Jr. (8)
| Capital One Arena14,505
| 2–10
|-bgcolor=ffcccc
| 13
| November 11
| Cleveland
| 
| Harrison Barnes (23)
| Harrison Barnes (12)
| Dennis Smith Jr. (7)
| American Airlines Center20,378
| 2–11
|-bgcolor=ffcccc
| 14
| November 12
| @ Oklahoma City
| 
| Harrison Barnes (22)
| Harrison Barnes (13)
| Ferrell, Matthews (4)
| Chesapeake Energy Arena18,203
| 2–12
|-bgcolor=ffcccc
| 15
| November 14
| San Antonio
| 
| Dennis Smith Jr. (27)
| Harrison Barnes (8)
| Dirk Nowitzki (6)
| American Airlines Center19,535
| 2–13
|-bgcolor=ffcccc
| 16
| November 17
| Minnesota
| 
| Harrison Barnes (18)
| Dirk Nowitzki (7)
| Barea, Harris, Smith Jr. (4)
| American Airlines Center19,459
| 2–14
|-bgcolor=ccffcc
| 17
| November 18
| Milwaukee
| 
| Wesley Matthews (22)
| Dwight Powell (13)
| Wesley Matthews (8)
| American Airlines Center19,949
| 3–14
|-bgcolor=ffcccc
| 18
| November 20
| Boston
| 
| Harrison Barnes (31)
| Dirk Nowitzki (12)
| Barea, Smith Jr. (4)
| American Airlines Center20,302
| 3–15
|-bgcolor=ccffcc
| 19
| November 22
| @ Memphis
| 
| Harrison Barnes (22)
| Harrison Barnes (9)
| J. J. Barea (11)
| FedExForum16,101
| 4–15
|-bgcolor=ccffcc
| 20
| November 25
| Oklahoma City
| 
| Dirk Nowitzki (19)
| Harrison Barnes (12)
| J. J. Barea (6)
| American Airlines Center20,340
| 5–15
|-bgcolor=ffcccc
| 21
| November 27
| @ San Antonio
| 
| Matthews, Smith Jr. (19)
| Harrison Barnes (8)
| J. J. Barea (7)
| AT&T Center17,918
| 5–16
|-bgcolor=ffcccc
| 22
| November 29
| Brooklyn
| 
| Harrison Barnes (17)
| Harrison Barnes (8)
| Harrison Barnes (6)
| American Airlines Center19,327
| 5–17

|-bgcolor=ccffcc
| 23
| December 2
| LA Clippers
| 
| J. J. Barea (21)
| Harrison Barnes (10)
| J. J. Barea (10)
| American Airlines Center19,245
| 6–17
|-bgcolor=ccffcc
| 24
| December 4
| Denver
| 
| Harrison Barnes (22)
| Harrison Barnes (10)
| J. J. Barea (9)
| American Airlines Center19,419
| 7–17
|-bgcolor=ffcccc
| 25
| December 6
| @ Boston
| 
| Harrison Barnes (19)
| Barnes, Ferrell, Powell (7)
| J. J. Barea (6)
| TD Garden18,624
| 7–18
|-bgcolor=ffcccc
| 26
| December 8
| @ Milwaukee
| 
| Wesley Matthews (29)
| Harrison Barnes (8)
| J. J. Barea (6)
| BMO Harris Bradley Center15,889
| 7–19
|-bgcolor=ffcccc
| 27
| December 10
| @ Minnesota
| 
| Harrison Barnes (19)
| Dwight Powell (6)
| Yogi Ferrell (7)
| Target Center13,094
| 7–20
|-bgcolor=ccffcc
| 28
| December 12
| San Antonio
| 
| Harrison Barnes (17)
| Dwight Powell (12)
| J. J. Barea (6)
| American Airlines Center19,874
| 8–20
|-bgcolor=ffcccc
| 29
| December 14
| @ Golden State
| 
| Dirk Nowitzki (18)
| Dirk Nowitzki (9)
| Barea, Harris (6)
| Oracle Arena19,596
| 8–21
|-bgcolor=ffcccc
| 30
| December 16
| @ San Antonio
| 
| Maximilian Kleber (21)
| Yogi Ferrell (11)
| Barea, Ferrell (6)
| AT&T Center18,418
| 8–22
|-bgcolor=ffcccc
| 31
| December 18
| Phoenix
| 
| Harrison Barnes (26)
| Maximilian Kleber (8)
| J. J. Barea (6)
| American Airlines Center19,245
| 8–23
|-bgcolor=ccffcc
| 32
| December 20
| Detroit
| 
| Harrison Barnes (25)
| Harrison Barnes (7)
| J. J. Barea (7)
| American Airlines Center19,580
| 9–23
|-bgcolor=ffcccc
| 33
| December 22
| @ Miami
| 
| Yogi Ferrell (23)
| Salah Mejri (5)
| J. J. Barea (8)
| American Airlines Arena19,600
| 9–24
|-bgcolor=ffcccc
| 34
| December 23
| @ Atlanta
| 
| Harrison Barnes (22)
| Dirk Nowitzki (6)
| J. J. Barea (12)
| Philips Arena13,402
| 9–25
|-bgcolor=ccffcc
| 35
| December 26
| Toronto
| 
| J. J. Barea (20)
| Harrison Barnes (10)
| Barea, Smith Jr. (4)
| American Airlines Center20,005
| 10–25
|-bgcolor=ccffcc
| 36
| December 27
| @ Indiana
| 
| Dirk Nowitzki (15)
| Dirk Nowitzki (7)
| J. J. Barea (7)
| Bankers Life Fieldhouse17,923
| 11–25
|-bgcolor=ccffcc
| 37
| December 29
| @ New Orleans
| 
| Dennis Smith Jr. (21)
| Dirk Nowitzki (12)
| Dennis Smith Jr. (10)
| Smoothie King Center16,878
| 12–25
|-bgcolor=ccffcc
| 38
| December 31
| @ Oklahoma City
| 
| Harrison Barnes (24)
| J. J. Barea (7)
| J. J. Barea (11)
| Chesapeake Energy Arena18,203
| 13–25

|-bgcolor=ffcccc
| 39
| January 3
| Golden State
| 
| Wesley Matthews (22)
| Nowitzki, Powell (8)
| Dennis Smith Jr. (8)
| American Airlines Center20,212
| 13–26
|-bgcolor=ffcccc
| 40
| January 5
| Chicago
| 
| Wesley Matthews (24)
| Harrison Barnes (7)
| J. J. Barea (9)
| American Airlines Center20,073
| 13–27
|-bgcolor=ffcccc
| 41
| January 7
| New York
|
| Harrison Barnes (25)
| Barnes, Mejri (7)
| Devin Harris (6)
| American Airlines Center20,171
| 13–28
|-bgcolor=ccffcc
| 42
| January 9
| Orlando
| 
| Smith Jr., Nowitzki (20)
| Yogi Ferrell (8)
| J. J. Barea (12)
| American Airlines Center19,306
| 14–28
|-bgcolor=ccffcc
| 43
| January 10
| @ Charlotte
| 
| Harrison Barnes (25)
| Harrison Barnes (11)
| Dennis Smith Jr. (6)
| Spectrum Center14,462
| 15–28
|-bgcolor=ffcccc
| 44
| January 13
| LA Lakers
| 
| Dennis Smith Jr. (23)
| Yogi Ferrell (10)
| Ferrell, Matthews (4)
| American Airlines Center20,209
| 15–29
|-bgcolor=ffcccc
| 45
| January 16
| @ Denver
| 
| Dennis Smith Jr. (25)
| Dwight Powell (7)
| Yogi Ferrell (7)
| Pepsi Center14,097
| 15–30
|-bgcolor=ffcccc
| 46
| January 20
| @ Portland
| 
| Wesley Matthews (23)
| Harrison Barnes (10)
| Dennis Smith Jr. (6)
| Moda Center19,464
| 15–31
|-bgcolor=ccffcc
| 47
| January 22
| Washington
| 
| Harrison Barnes (20)
| Harrison Barnes (10)
| Dennis Smith Jr. (6)
| American Airlines Center19,328
| 16–31
|-bgcolor=ffcccc
| 48
| January 24
| Houston
| 
| Wesley Matthews (29)
| Salah Mejri (10)
| Dennis Smith Jr. (6)
| American Airlines Center19,378
| 16–32
|-bgcolor=ffcccc
| 49
| January 26
| Portland
| 
| Harrison Barnes (21)
| Harrison Barnes (7)
| Dennis Smith Jr. (7)
| American Airlines Center19,876
| 16–33
|-bgcolor=ffcccc
| 50
| January 27
| @ Denver
| 
| Harrison Barnes (22)
| Barnes, Matthews, Mejri, Smith Jr. (6)
| Dennis Smith Jr. (6)
| Pepsi Center19,520
| 16–34
|-bgcolor=ffcccc
| 51
| January 29
| Miami
| 
| Harrison Barnes (20)
| Dwight Powell (10)
| Dennis Smith Jr. (10)
| American Airlines Center19,555
| 16–35
|-bgcolor=ffcccc
| 52
| January 31
| @ Phoenix
| 
| Dennis Smith Jr. (17)
| Dirk Nowitzki (10)
| Dennis Smith Jr. (6)
| Talking Stick Resort Arena15,923
| 16–36

|-bgcolor=ccffcc
| 53
| February 3
| @ Sacramento
| 
| Harrison Barnes (18)
| Dwight Powell (9)
| J. J. Barea (11)
| Golden 1 Center17,583
| 17–36
|-bgcolor=ffcccc
| 54
| February 5
| @ LA Clippers
| 
| Wesley Matthews (23)
| Dwight Powell (10)
| three players (5)
| Staples Center15,127
| 17–37
|-bgcolor=ffcccc
| 55
| February 8
| @ Golden State
| 
| Dennis Smith Jr. (22)
| Dirk Nowitzki (11)
| J. J. Barea (8)
| Oracle Arena19,596
| 17–38
|-bgcolor=ccffcc
| 56
| February 10
| LA Lakers
| 
| Dirk Nowitzki (22)
| Dwight Powell (7)
| J. J. Barea (9)
| American Airlines Center20,162
| 18–38
|-bgcolor=ffcccc
| 57
| February 11
| @ Houston
| 
| Yogi Ferrell (20)
| Dwight Powell (12)
| Dennis Smith Jr. (11)
| Toyota Center18,055
| 18–39
|-bgcolor=ffcccc
| 58
| February 13
| Sacramento
| 
| J. J. Barea (19)
| Nowitzki, Powell (6)
| J. J. Barea (13)
| American Airlines Center19,801
| 18–40
|-bgcolor=ffcccc
| 59
| February 23
| @ LA Lakers
| 
| Barnes, Matthews (19)
| Harrison Barnes (7)
| J. J. Barea (6)
| Staples Center18,997
| 18–41
|-bgcolor=ffcccc
| 60
| February 24
| @ Utah
| 
| J. J. Barea (17)
| Dirk Nowitzki (12)
| J. J. Barea (10)
| Vivint Smart Home Arena18,306
| 18–42
|-bgcolor=ccffcc
| 61
| February 26
| Indiana
| 
| Harrison Barnes (21)
| Dwight Powell (14)
| J. J. Barea (9)
| American Airlines Center19,536
| 19–42
|-bgcolor=ffcccc
| 62
| February 28
| Oklahoma City
| 
| Harrison Barnes (26)
| Dirk Nowitzki (8)
| J. J. Barea (7)
| American Airlines Center20,202
| 19–43

|-bgcolor=ffcccc
| 63
| March 2
| @ Chicago
| 
| Harrison Barnes (26)
| Dwight Powell (11)
| Wesley Matthews (4)
| United Center21,017
| 19–44
|-bgcolor=ffcccc
| 64
| March 4
| New Orleans
| 
| Nowitzki, Smith Jr. (23)
| Dwight Powell (11)
| Dennis Smith Jr. (7)
| American Airlines Center19,798
| 19–45
|-bgcolor=ccffcc
| 65
| March 6
| Denver
| 
| Yogi Ferrell (24)
| Nerlens Noel (14)
| Dennis Smith Jr. (11)
| American Airlines Center19,504
| 20–45
|-bgcolor=ccffcc
| 66
| March 10
| Memphis
| 
| Harrison Barnes (25)
| Dwight Powell (10)
| Yogi Ferrell (6)
| American Airlines Center19,579
| 21–45
|-bgcolor=ffcccc
| 67
| March 11
| Houston
| 
| Dwight Powell (20)
| Kyle Collinsworth (10)
| J. J. Barea (13)
| American Airlines Center20,394
| 21–46
|-bgcolor=ccffcc
| 68
| March 13
| @ New York
| 
| Harrison Barnes (30)
| Dorian Finney-Smith (9)
| J. J. Barea (7)
| Madison Square Garden18,597
| 22–46
|-bgcolor=ffcccc
| 69
| March 16
| @ Toronto
| 
| Harrison Barnes (27)
| Dwight Powell (8)
| J. J. Barea (6)
| Air Canada Centre19,800
| 22–47
|-bgcolor=ffcccc
| 70
| March 17
| @ Brooklyn
| 
| Dennis Smith Jr. (21)
| Collinsworth, Jones, Nowitzki (7)
| Yogi Ferrell (12)
| Barclays Center13,877
| 22–48
|-bgcolor=ffcccc
| 71
| March 20
| @ New Orleans
| 
| Barnes, Nowitzki (19)
| three players (6)
| J. J. Barea (8)
| Smoothie King Center14,484
| 22–49
|-bgcolor=ffcccc
| 72
| March 22
| Utah
| 
| J. J. Barea (23)
| Dorian Finney-Smith (5)
| J. J. Barea (8)
| American Airlines Center19,725
| 22–50
|-bgcolor=ffcccc
| 73
| March 24
| Charlotte
| 
| Dennis Smith Jr. (21)
| Nerlens Noel (12)
| Dennis Smith Jr. (6)
| American Airlines Center20,085
| 22–51
|-bgcolor=ccffcc
| 74
| March 27
| @ Sacramento
| 
| Harrison Barnes (20)
| Maxi Kleber (9)
| Barnes, Smith Jr. (6)
| Golden 1 Center17,583
| 23–51
|-bgcolor=ffcccc
| 75
| March 28
| @ LA Lakers
| 
| Harrison Barnes (17)
| Dirk Nowitzki (7)
| Dennis Smith Jr. (8)
| Staples Center18,997
| 23–52
|-bgcolor=ffcccc
| 76
| March 30
| Minnesota
| 
| Harrison Barnes (19)
| Nerlens Noel (12)
| Dennis Smith Jr. (7)
| American Airlines Center20,244
| 23–53

|-bgcolor=ffcccc
| 77
| April 1
| @ Cleveland
| 
| Harrison Barnes (30)
| Noel, Nowitzki (7)
| Harrison Barnes (5)
| Quicken Loans Arena20,562
| 23–54
|-bgcolor=ccffcc
| 78
| April 3
| Portland
| 
| Dennis Smith Jr. (18)
| Kleber, Smith Jr. (8)
| Dennis Smith Jr. (8)
| American Airlines Center19,624
| 24–54
|-bgcolor=ffcccc
| 79
| April 4
| @ Orlando
| 
| Jalen Jones (15)
| Kyle Collinsworth (9)
| Yogi Ferrell (7)
| Amway Center18,112
| 24–55
|-bgcolor=ffcccc
| 80
| April 6
| @ Detroit
| 
| Johnathan Motley (26)
| Johnathan Motley (12)
| Dennis Smith Jr. (8)
| Little Caesars Arena18,768
| 24–56
|-bgcolor=ffcccc
| 81
| April 8
| @ Philadelphia
| 
| Harrison Barnes (21)
| Dwight Powell (10)
| Dennis Smith Jr. (11)
| Wells Fargo Center20,846
| 24–57
|-bgcolor=ffcccc
| 82
| April 10
| Phoenix
| 
| Johnathan Motley (21)
| Kyle Collinsworth (11)
| Kyle Collinsworth (8)
| American Airlines Center20,041
| 24–58

Player statistics

After all games.

|-
| 
| 69 || 10 || 23.2 || .439 || .367 || .784 || 2.9 || style=background:#0B60AD;color:white;|6.3 || .5 || .0 || 11.6
|-
| 
| 77 || style=background:#0B60AD;color:white;|77 || style=background:#0B60AD;color:white;|34.2 || .445 || .357 || .827 || style=background:#0B60AD;color:white;|6.1 || 2.0 || .6 || .2 || style=background:#0B60AD;color:white;|18.9
|-
| ‡
| 7 || 0 || 9.1 || .333 || .400 || style=background:#0B60AD;color:white;|1.000 || 1.0 || .4 || .3 || .0 || 2.9
|-
| ‡
| 13 || 0 || 6.2 || .286 || .000 || .500 || .8 || .2 || .5 || .3 || .8
|-
| 
| 32 || 2 || 15.0 || .384 || .235 || .525 || 3.3 || 1.8 || .5 || .3 || 3.2
|-
| 
| style=background:#0B60AD;color:white;|82 || 21 || 27.8 || .426 || .373 || .796 || 3.0 || 2.5 || .8 || .1 || 10.2
|-
| 
| 21 || 13 || 21.3 || .380 || .299 || .733 || 3.6 || 1.2 || .5 || .2 || 5.9
|-
| †
| 44 || 1 || 18.3 || .415 || .352 || .830 || 1.9 || 1.9 || .8 || .2 || 8.5
|-
| 
| 9 || 3 || 25.9 || .275 || .209 || .765 || 2.7 || 1.2 || 1.0 || .2 || 6.7
|-
| ‡
| 1 || 0 || 8.0 || .000 || .000 || .500 || .0 || 1.0 || .0 || .0 || 1.0
|-
| 
| 12 || 0 || 13.5 || .397 || .360 || .588 || 2.9 || .3 || .4 || .1 || 5.8
|-
| 
| 72 || 36 || 16.8 || .489 || .313 || .746 || 3.3 || .7 || .4 || .7 || 5.4
|-
| 
| 63 || 62 || 33.8 || .406 || .381 || .822 || 3.1 || 2.7 || style=background:#0B60AD;color:white;|1.2 || .3 || 12.7
|-
| 
| 26 || 3 || 22.9 || .478 || style=background:#0B60AD;color:white;|.494 || .857 || 2.5 || 1.1 || .3 || .2 || 9.0
|-
| ‡
| 2 || 0 || 3.0 || .000 || .000 || .000 || .0 || .0 || .0 || .0 || .0
|-
| 
| 61 || 1 || 12.0 || style=background:#0B60AD;color:white;|.642 || .000 || .576 || 4.0 || .6 || .4 || style=background:#0B60AD;color:white;|1.1 || 3.5
|-
| 
| 11 || 4 || 16.0 || .533 || .167 || .536 || 4.5 || .6 || .3 || .2 || 8.7
|-
| 
| 30 || 6 || 15.7 || .524 || .000 || .750 || 5.6 || .7 || 1.0 || .7 || 4.4
|-
| 
| 77 || 77 || 24.7 || .456 || .409 || .898 || 5.7 || 1.6 || .6 || .6 || 12.0
|-
| 
| 79 || 25 || 21.2 || .593 || .333 || .719 || 5.6 || 1.2 || .8 || .4 || 8.5
|-
| 
| 69 || 69 || 29.7 || .395 || .313 || .694 || 3.8 || 5.2 || 1.0 || .3 || 15.2
|-
| ‡
| 3 || 0 || 9.0 || .583 || .000 || .600 || 3.0 || .0 || .0 || .0 || 5.7
|-
| ‡
| 9 || 0 || 4.3 || .375 || .200 || .500 || 1.1 || .0 || .0 || .3 || 1.7
|}
‡Waived during the season
†Traded during the season

Transactions

Trades

Free agents

Re-signed

Additions

Subtractions

References

Dallas Mavericks seasons
Dallas Mavericks
Dallas Mavericks
Dallas Mavericks
2010s in Dallas
2017 in Texas
2018 in Texas